WLIC is a Contemporary Christian and Religious formatted broadcast radio station licensed to Frostburg, Maryland, serving Cumberland and Frostburg in Maryland and Keyser in West Virginia.  WLIC is owned and operated by Calvary Chapel Cumberland.

References

External links
 Reveal FM Online
 

1989 establishments in Maryland
Contemporary Christian radio stations in the United States
Radio stations established in 1989
LIC
Frostburg, Maryland